A cleft sentence is a complex sentence (one having a main clause and a dependent clause) that has a meaning that could be expressed by a simple sentence. Clefts typically put a particular constituent into focus. In spoken language, this focusing is often accompanied by a special intonation.

In English, a cleft sentence can be constructed as follows:

it + conjugated form of to be + X + subordinate clause

where it is a cleft pronoun and X is usually a noun phrase (although it can also be a prepositional phrase, and in some cases an adjectival or adverbial phrase). The focus is on X, or else on the subordinate clause or some element of it. For example:
It's Joey (whom) we're looking for.
It's money that I love.
It was from John that she heard the news.

Furthermore, one might also describe a cleft sentence as inverted. That is to say, it has its dependent clause in front of the main clause. So, rather than:
Example:
We didn't meet her until we arrived at the hotel.

the cleft would be:

It wasn't until we arrived at the hotel that (or when) we met her.

Types 

English is very rich in cleft constructions. Below are examples of some types of clefts found in English, though the list is not exhaustive. See Lambrecht 2001 for a comprehensive survey, Collins 1991 for an in-depth analysis of it-clefts and wh-clefts in English, and Calude 2009 for an investigation of clefts in spoken English.

It-cleft 
In English, it-clefts consist of the pronoun it, followed by a form of the verb to be, a cleft constituent, and a complementizer, which introduces a relative clause that is attributed to the cleft phrase. It-clefts introduce two meanings parts: (1) a presupposition that the property in the clause following the complementiser holds of some entity; and (ii) an assertion that this property holds of the entity denoted by the cleft constituent.

 English it-cleft: It was John that Mary saw.

Wh-cleft/Pseudo-cleft 
In English, pseudo-clefts consist of an interrogative clause in subject position, and a focused element appears at the end of the sentence – this is followed by a form of the verb be. For many speakers, pseudo-cleft construction is only possible with what (as opposed to who, where...). Pseudo-clefts are tools for presenting and highlighting new information, serving as the building blocks of a coherent discourse progression, and a rhetorical toolkit to construct an authorial stance, being a grammatical resource for making evaluative meaning.

 English wh-cleft/pseudo-cleft: What Mary bought was a first edition.

Reversed wh-cleft/Inverted pseudo-cleft 
In English, an inverted pseudo-cleft consists of the identical structure to pseudoclefting, however, the two strings around the verb be are inverted.  The focus element has been brought to the front of the sentence, and the clause is sentence final.

 English reversed wh-cleft/inverted pseudo-cleft:

 A Fiat is what he wanted to buy.
 Alice was who John was talking to.

All-cleft 
In English, all-cleft sentences are related to pseudo-clefts in which they are constructed with the subject of the sentence embedded in the phrase and expressed with the verb "to be".  Where pseudo-clefts begin with a wh-phrase (what, where, who), all-clefts begin with the use of the word "all".

 English all-cleft:

 All he wanted to buy was a Fiat.
 All they want is a holiday.

Inferential cleft 
In English, inferential clefts involve a subordinate clause that is embedded as a complement of the verb "to be", and the sentence begins with the subject "it". Oftentimes, an inferential cleft will include an adverb such as only, simply or just. While they are analyzed in written text, data on inferential clefts are often found in spoken language and act as a subordinate clause of the subject they are inferring.

 English inferential cleft:

 It is not that he loves her. It's just that he has a way with her that is different.
 It was just that it was raining.

There-cleft 
Looking at existential sentences, in all languages, they are understood to belong to a grammatically distinct construction, which is utilized to express existential positions. Cleft-sentences in English contain existential sentences that have a dummy there as a subject, be as a main verb, and an NP in the post-verbal complement position. To elaborate, dummy there can be distinguished as an adverbial, pronoun, and subject. Likewise, be can be distinguished as a main verb, and may contain other intransitive verbs such as come, remain, exist, arise, and stand. Lastly, post-verbal NP depends on the discourse of the entity or entities that refer to the novel information it is expressing.

 English dummy there-cleft:

 There's nobody there.
 There seemed to be nothing he couldn't do.

 English be there-cleft: There comes a stage when a player should move on.
 English post-verbal NP there-cleft: There was George Talbot and there was Ted.
 English there-cleft: And then there's a new house he wanted to build.

If-because cleft 
Traditional accounts of cleft structures classify these according to the elements involved following English-centric analyses (such as wh-words, the pronoun it, the quantifier all, and so on). This makes it difficult to conduct cross-linguistic investigations of clefts since these elements do not exist in all other languages, which has led to a proposal for a revision of existing cleft taxonomy (see Calude 2009).

However, not all languages are so rich in cleft types as English, and some employ other means for focusing specific constituents, such as topicalization, word order changes, focusing particles and so on (see Miller 1996). Cleftability in Language (2009) by Cheng Luo presents a cross-linguistic discussion of cleftability.

 English if-because cleft: If he wants to be an actor it's because he wants to be famous.

Structural issues 
The role of the cleft pronoun (it in the case of English) is controversial, and some believe it to be referential, while others treat it as a dummy pronoun or empty element. The former analysis has come to be termed the "expletive" view, whereas the latter is referred to as the "extraposition" approach. Hedberg (2002) proposes a hybrid approach, combining ideas from both takes on the status of the cleft pronoun. She shows that it can have a range of scopes (from semantically void to full reference) depending on the context in which it is used.

Similarly controversial is the status of the subordinate clause, often termed the "cleft clause". While most would agree that the cleft clause in wh-clefts can be analysed as some kind of relative clause (free or fused or headless), there is disagreement as to the exact nature of the relative. Traditionally, the wh-word in a cleft such as What you need is a good holiday, pertaining to the relative What you need, is understood to be the first constituent of the relative clause, and to function as its head.

Bresnan and Grimshaw (1978) posit a different analysis. They suggest that the relative clause is headed (rather than headless), with wh-word being located outside the clause proper and functioning as its head. Miller (1996) also endorses this approach, citing cross-linguistic evidence that the wh-word functions as indefinite deictics.

The cleft clause debate gets more complex with it-clefts, where researchers struggle to even agree as to the type of clause that is involved: the traditionalists claim it to be a relative clause (Huddleston and Pullum 2002), while others reject this on the basis of a lack of noun phrase antecedent (Quirk et al. 1985, Sornicola 1988, Miller 1999), as exemplified below:
 It was because he was ill that we decided to return.
 It was in September that he first found out about it.
 It was with great reluctance that Maria accepted the invitation.

Finally, the last element of a cleft is the cleft constituent, which typically corresponds to the focus. As mentioned earlier, the focused part of a cleft is typically a noun phrase, but may in fact, turn up to be just about anything:
 Prepositional phrase: It was on foot that he went there.
 Adverbial phrase: It was greedily and speedily that Homer Simpson drank his beer.
 Non-finite clause: It is to address a far-reaching problem that Oxfam is launching this campaign.
 Gerund: It could be going home early or slacking off at work that the boss reacted to.
 Adverbial clause: It was because she was so lonely all the time that she decided to move out.

Information structure 
Clefts have been described as "equative" (Halliday 1976), "stative" (Delin and Oberlander 1995) and as "variable-value pairs", where the cleft constituent gives a variable expressed by the cleft clause (Herriman 2004, Declerck 1994, Halliday 1994). A major area of interest with regard to cleft constructions involves their information structure. The concept of "information structure" relates to the type of information encoded in a particular utterance, that can be one of these three:
 NEW information: things that the speaker/writer expects their hearer/reader might not already know
 GIVEN information: information that the speaker/writer expects the hearer/reader may be familiar with
 INFERRABLE information: information that the speaker/writer may expect the hearer/reader to be able to infer either from world knowledge, or from previous discourse

The reason why information structure plays such an important role in the area of clefts is largely due to the fact that the organisation of information structure is tightly linked to the clefts' function as focusing tools used by speakers/writers to draw attention to salient parts of their message.

While it may be reasonable to assume that the variable of a cleft (that is, the material encoded by cleft clauses) may be typically GIVEN and its value (expressed by the cleft constituent) is NEW, it is not always so. Sometimes, neither element contains new information, as is in some demonstrative clefts, e.g., That is what I think and sometimes it is the cleft clause that contains the NEW part of the message, as in And that's when I got sick (Calude 2009). Finally, in some constructions, it is the equation between cleft clause and cleft constituent that brings about the newsworthy information, rather than any of the elements of the cleft themselves (Lambrecht 2001).

Other languages

Mandarin 
The shì...de construction in Mandarin is used to produce the equivalent of cleft sentences. However, in traditional grammar, shì...de clefts were seen as a construction with a function in reference to the construction as a whole. Both shì, the copula, and de can occur in other contexts that express information-structural categories, but they are sometimes hard to distinguish from shì...de clefts. In addition, certain constructions with relative clauses have been referred to as "pseudo-cleft" constructions. See  for details.

Examples:

Spanish 
There exist several constructions which play the role of cleft sentences. A very common resource is the adding of "es que" (time-dependent). Similar to English cleft sentences, time-dependent cleft constructions in Spanish also share a temporal relationship between the verb of the relative clause and the copula.

From uncleft ¿Adónde fuiste?

Another mechanism is the use of the identificating structure, or relative pronouns, "el/la que", "el/la cual" as well as the neuters: "lo que" and "lo cual". This form of cleft construction highlights an importance between the entity and the number and gender of said entity that is uttered in a cleft sentence.

Possible uncleft variants: No quiero ir, Ir no quiero

Furthermore, one can also utilize "cuando" and "donde" when one wants to refer to "that" in a frame of time or place.

"Fue en Londres donde nací" (It was in London that I was born), possible uncleft variants Nací en Londres

French 
In French, when a cleft is used to reply to a wh-question, it can either appear in a complete form: Matrix 'C'est XP' + relative clause 'que/qui YP' or in a reduced one, Matrix 'C'est XP'.

Example:
"C'est Jean que je cherche" (It's Jean whom I'm looking for)
"C'est à Paris que j'habite" (It's in Paris where I live)
Example with Gloss:

Cleft sentences are the most natural way to answer a wh-question in French. For example, if one were to ask:

a.

It would be answered with the following it-cleft:

b.

Japanese 
The X no wa (ga) construction in Japanese is frequently used to produce the equivalent of cleft sentences. In addition, a gap precedes its filler in both subject cleft (SC) constructions and object cleft (OC) constructions. Japanese speakers have reported that there is an object gap preference in Japanese cleft constructions due to temporal structural ambiguities in subject clefts.

Example:

Example of a subject cleft construction:

Example of an object cleft construction:

Goidelic languages
The construction is frequent in the Goidelic languages (Scottish Gaelic, Irish, and Manx), much more so than in English, and can be used in ways that would be ambiguous or ungrammatical in English: almost any element of a sentence can be clefted.  This sometimes carries over into the local varieties of English (Highland English, Lowland Scots, Scottish English, Hiberno-English).

The following examples from Scottish Gaelic are based on the sentence , "Iain heard the music last night":

 ("It's Iain who heard the music last night" e.g. as opposed to Mary)
 ("It's the music that Iain heard last night" e.g. as opposed to the speech)
 ("It's last night that Iain heard the music" e.g. as opposed to last week)
 ("It's heard that Iain the music last night" e.g. as opposed to making the music)

Tagalog

Cleft sentences are copula constructions in which the focused element serves as the predicate of the sentence.

In the examples in (1) and (2), the foci are in bold. The remaining portions of the cleft sentences in (1) and (2) are noun phrases that contain headless relative clauses. (NB: Tagalog does not have an overt copula.)

This construction is also used for WH-questions in Tagalog, when the WH-word used in the question is either sino "who" or ano "what", as illustrated in (3) and (4).

Notes

References 

Akmajian, A. 1970. On deriving cleft sentences from pseudo-cleft sentences. Linguistic Inquiry, 1(149-168).
Bolinger, D. 1972. A Look at Equations and Cleft Sentences. In Firchow, E., editor, Studies for Einar Haugen, pages 96–114. Mouton de Gruyter, The Hague.
Borkin, A. 1984. Problems in Form and Function. Ablex, Norwood, NJ.
Bresnan, J. and Grimshaw, J. (1978). The Syntax of Free Relatives in English. Linguistic Inquiry, 9:331–391.
Calude, Andreea S. 2009. Cleft Constructions in Spoken English. VDM Verlag Dr. Müller, Saarbrücken.
Chomsky, N. 1977. On wh-movement. In Culicover, P., Wasow, T., and Akmajian, A., editors, Formal Syntax, pages 71–132. Academic Press, New York.
Collins, P. 1991. Cleft and pseudo-cleft constructions in English. Routledge, London.
Declerk, R. 1994. The taxonomy and interpretation of clefts and pseudoclefts. Lingua, 9(1):183–220.
Delahunty, G.P. 1982. Topics in the syntax and semantics of English cleft sentences. Indiana University Linguistics Club, Bloomington.
Delin, J. 1989. Cleft constructions in discourse. Unpublished doctoral dissertation, University of Edinburgh.
Delin, J. and Oberlander, J. 1995. Syntactic constraints on discourse structure: the case of it-clefts. Linguistics, 33:456–500.
Dušková, L. 2005, From the Heritage of Vilém Mathesius and Jan Firbas: Syntax in the Service of FSP. Theory and Practice in English Studies. Proceedings from the Eighth Conference of British, American and Canadian Studies. Brno: Masarykova univerzita, 3:7-23.
Emonds, J. 1976. A Transformational Approach to English Syntax. Academic Press, New York.
Finegan, Edward. 2004. Language: Its Structure and Use. 4th ed. Boston etc. Thompson. p. 260-277.
Gundel, J. 1977. Where do clefts sentences come from? Language, 53:542–559.
Halliday, M.A.K. 1994. An introduction to functional grammar. Arnold, London, 2nd Edition.
Halliday, M.A.K. 1976. Some aspects of the thematic organization of the English clause. In Kress, G., editor, System and Function in Language, pages 174–188. Oxford University Press, Oxford.
Hedberg, N. 2000. The referential status of clefts. Language, 76(4):891–920.
Heggie, L. 1988. The Syntax of Copular Structures. Doctoral dissertation, University of Southern California.
Herriman, J. 2004. Identifying relations: the semantic functions of wh-clefts in English. Text, 24(4):447–469.
Huddleston, R. and Pullum, G. 2002. The Cambridge Grammar of the English Language. Cambridge University Press, New York.
Kiss, K. 1998. Identificational focus versus information focus. Language, 74(2):245–273.
Lambrecht, Knud. 2001. A framework for the analysis of cleft constructions. Linguistics, 39(3):463-516.
Luo, C. 2009. Cleftability in Language. Wuhan University Press, China.
Miller, J. 1999. Magnasyntax and syntactic analysis. Revue française de linguistique appliquée, IV(2):7–20.
Miller, J. 1996. Clefts, particles and word order in languages of Europe. Language Sciences, 18(1-2):111–125.
Quirk, R., Greenbaum, S., Leech, G., and Svartvik, J. 1985. A comprehensive grammar of the English language. Longman, London, New York.
Sornicola, R. 1988. It -clefts and Wh-clefts: two awkward sentence types. Linguistics, 24:343–379.

Sentences by type
Word order